Maria Victoria Carpio-Bernido (17 November 1961 – 6 January 2022) was a Filipino physicist.

She was the recipient of the 2010 Ramon Magsaysay Award, for commitment to both science and her nation, ensuring innovative, low-cost, and effective basic education even under the Philippine conditions of poverty.

She died from colon cancer on 6 January 2022, at the age of 60.

References

1961 births
2022 deaths
Filipino physicists
Ramon Magsaysay Award winners
Deaths from colorectal cancer